Edmund Buckley may refer to:
Edmund Buckley (politician, born 1780) (1780–1867), Member of Parliament (MP) for Newcastle-under-Lyme 1841–1842
Sir Edmund Buckley, 1st Baronet (1834–1910), MP for Newcastle-under-Lyme 1865–1878
Sir Edmund Buckley, 2nd Baronet (1861–1919)

See also
Buckley (surname)